Żarnówka may refer to the following places:
Żarnówka, Lesser Poland Voivodeship (south Poland)
Żarnówka, Węgrów County in Masovian Voivodeship (east-central Poland)
Żarnówka, Żuromin County in Masovian Voivodeship (east-central Poland)